
Gmina Kuczbork-Osada is a rural gmina (administrative district) in Żuromin County, Masovian Voivodeship, in east-central Poland. Its seat is the village of Kuczbork-Osada, which lies approximately 9 kilometres (6 mi) north-east of Żuromin and 115 km (71 mi) north-west of Warsaw.

Villages
Gmina Kuczbork-Osada contains the villages and settlements of Bagienice Duże, Bagienice Małe, Bagienice Nowe, Chodubka, Chojnowo, Gościszka, Kozielsk, Krzywki-Bratki, Kuczbork-Osada, Kuczbork-Wieś, Łążek, Mianowo, Nidzgora, Niedziałki, Nowa Wieś, Olszewko, Osowa, Przyspa, Sarnowo, Szronka, Wygoda and Zielona.

Neighbouring gminas
Gmina Kuczbork-Osada is bordered by the gminas of Działdowo, Lipowiec Kościelny, Lubowidz, Płośnica, Szreńsk and Żuromin.

References
Polish official population figures 2006

Kuczbork-Osada
Gmina Kuczbork Osada